Carex arctiformis, the polar sedge, is a species of sedge native to sphagnum bogs and other wetlands in northwestern North America (British Columbia and southeastern Alaska).

It was first formally named by Kenneth Mackenzie in 1931.

References

arctiformis
Flora of North America
Plants described in 1931